The Women's Senior T20 Challenger Trophy is a women's T20 tournament held in India. The tournament first took place in the 2009–10 season, as the T20 equivalent to the List A Senior Women's Challenger Trophy. The participating teams were the same as in the List A tournament: India Blue, India Green and India Red, with India Green emerging victorious in the final. The tournament later returned in the 2018–19 season, with India Blue winning their first title, defeating India Red by 4 runs in the final.  In the third edition of the tournament in 2019–20, the teams competing were named India A, India B and India C, with India C winning the final by 8 wickets over India B. The tournament returned in 2022–23, now with four teams competing, and was won by the new team, India D.

Competition format
Matches in the tournament are played using a Twenty20 format. In the first season, the three teams played each other once in a round-robin format, with the top two in the group advancing to the final to play-off for the title. In the next two seasons, the tournament expanded to a double round-robin format, with teams playing each twice in the initial group stage before the top two advanced to the final. In 2022–23, the tournament changed back to a round-robin format, but with one extra team, meaning the number of overall matches stayed the same.

Teams are awarded 4 points for a win, with most wins being the first tiebreaker if teams are joint on points.

Tournament results

References

Women's Senior T20 Challenger Trophy
Women's cricket competitions in India
Indian domestic cricket competitions
2010 establishments in India
Twenty20 cricket leagues